The Journal of Anatomy is a monthly peer-reviewed scientific journal published by Wiley on behalf of the Anatomical Society. It covers all aspects of anatomy and morphology. The journal was first published in 1867 and was originally known as the Journal of Anatomy and Physiology, obtaining its current title in October 1916. The editors-in-chief are Phil Cox (Hull York Medical School), Stefan Milz (Ludwig-Maximilians University), James N. Sleigh (University College London) and Neil Vargesson (University of Aberdeen).

According to the Journal Citation Reports, the journal has a 2021 impact factor of 2.921. In conjunction with their centennial in 2009, the international Special Libraries Association included the Journal of Anatomy as one of the 100 most influential journals in biology and medicine over the past 100 years.

History
The journal was established in 1867 as the Journal of Anatomy and Physiology. The journal was conceived at the 1866 meeting of the British Association in Nottingham by founding editors George Murray Humphry (University of Cambridge), William Turner (University of Edinburgh), Alfred Newton (University of Cambridge), and Edward Perceval Wright (University of Dublin). At the time of the journal's first publication, the subjects of anatomy and physiology were not regarded as separate entities and were both taught within anatomy departments. The journal was renamed Journal of Anatomy in 1916 (vol. 51), when it was adopted by the Anatomical Society, both in terms of management and ownership.

In a celebratory issue marking 150 years since its first publication, two commissioned reviews were published; one that provided a detailed historical overview of the journal and another that summarised the broader history of topographical anatomy over the last several thousand years.

Past editors
The following persons have been editor-in-chief:
 John Gray McKendrick
 Daniel John Cunningham
 Alexander Macalister
 Arthur Keith
 Herbert Henry Woollard
 Wilfred Le Gros Clark

Best paper award
The "Journal of Anatomy Best Paper Prize" has been awarded annually by the Anatomical Society since 2008, with additional runner-up prizes since 2011.

References

External links

 Journal  page on the Anatomical Society website

Anatomy journals
Wiley-Blackwell academic journals
Monthly journals